Perssons Pack was a Swedish music group that played folk rock. The group started in 1989 and it disbanded in March 2014.

References

Swedish folk rock groups